Elachista argentella is a moth of the family Elachistidae found in all of Europe, except the Balkan Peninsula.

The head is white. Forewings are white, sometimes ochreous- tinged. Hindwings in male grey in female grey-whitish.The  larva is greenish-grey ; dorsal line whitish;head pale brown.

The moth flies from May to July depending on the location.

The larvae feed on a number of different species of grass including Agrostis, Avenula pratensis, Avenula pubescens, Brachypodium pinnatum, Brachypodium sylvaticum, Bromus erectus, Bromus sterilis, Calamagrostis epigejos, Dactylis glomerata, Deschampsia cespitosa, Elymus hispidus, Elymus repens, Festuca ovina, Festuca rubra, Festuca trachyphylla, Festuca valesiaca, Holcus lanatus, Holcus mollis, Koeleria glauca, Koeleria grandis, Koeleria macrantha, Leymus arenarius, Phalaris arundinacea, Phleum and Poa pratensis. They mine the leaves of their host plant. The mine starts as a narrow corridor in which the larva hibernates. In March, it vacates the mine and moves to a new leaf where it creates a transparent, full depth mine that descends from the leaf tip, and occupies the entire width of the blade. Most frass is deposited in the oldest upper part of the mine. The larva may again vacate the mine and restart elsewhere. Larvae can be found from late summer to early May. They are grey green with a pale brown head. Pupation takes place outside of the mine.

References

External links
waarneming.nl 
Lepidoptera of Belgium
 Elachista argentella at UKmoths

argentella
Leaf miners
Moths described in 1759
Moths of Europe
Taxa named by Carl Alexander Clerck